Humming House is an American folk band from Nashville, Tennessee.

Career
Humming House began in 2011. The group released their first full-length album the following year. In 2014, Humming House released a live album titled Humming House Party!. In 2015, Humming House released their second full-length album titled Revelries. In 2017, Humming House released their third full-length album titled Companion.

Band members
Justin Wade Tam
Bobby Chase
Joshua Wolak
Benjamin Jones

Discography
Studio albums
Humming House (2012, Humble Mouse)
Revelries (2015, Humble Mouse)
Companion (2017, Soundly Music, Sony Red)
Live albums
Humming House Party! (2014, Humble Mouse)

References

Musical groups from Nashville, Tennessee
Musical groups established in 2011
2011 establishments in Tennessee